Electric Rodeo may refer to:

 Electric Rodeo (Shooter Jennings album), 2006
 Electric Rodeo (Lee Kernaghan album), 2002